The following lists events that happened during 1856 in Australia.

Incumbents

Governors
Governors of the Australian colonies:
 Governor of New South Wales – Sir William Denison
 Governor of South Australia – Sir Richard MacDonnell
 Governor of Tasmania – Sir Henry Young
 Governor of Victoria – Sir Henry Barkly
 Governor of Western Australia as a Crown Colony – Sir Arthur Kennedy.

Premiers
Premiers of the Australian colonies:
 Premier of New South Wales – Stuart Donaldson from 6 June to 25 August then Charles Cowper to 2 October then Henry Parker
 Premier of Queensland – office not created until 1859
 Premier of South Australia – Boyle Travers Finniss from 24 October
 Premier of Tasmania – William Champ from 1 November
 Premier of Victoria – Dr William Haines
 Premier of Western Australia – office not created until 1890

Events
 6 January – French musician and composer Nicolas-Charles Bochsa dies in Sydney.
 7 February – Tasmanian Electoral Act introduced the secret ballot, which was known elsewhere, in particular in the United States as the "Australian ballot"
 19 March – The Electoral Act 1856 introduced the secret ballot in Victoria
 2 April – South Australia introduced the secret ballot
 11 April – At a public meeting in Melbourne, Dr Thomas Embling repeated the slogan "eight hours labour, eight hours recreation, eight hours rest".
 22 May – First Parliament of New South Wales opened by the governor, Sir William Denison
 24 June – Queen Victoria makes Norfolk Island a separate settlement from Tasmania to be administered by the Governor of New South Wales.
 23 September – The town of Perth, Western Australia, is proclaimed a City by letters patent from Queen Victoria.
 25 November – The first Parliament of Victoria is officially opened by the Acting Governor Edward Macarthur.

Exploration and settlement
1 January – The name Tasmania officially adopted to replace Van Diemen's Land which was felt to have too many convict connotations.
8 June – Pitcairn Islanders arrived on Norfolk Island; the last convict had left and the island was no longer a penal colony.  Queen Victoria granted the island to the Pitcairners as a home. Bounty Day is celebrated each year in Norfolk Island to commemorate the event.
Suburb of Goodna founded in Queensland, Australia – Originally part of NSW, its 150-year anniversary was celebrated in 2006.

Births

 25 January – Sir John Hoad, 4th Chief of the General Staff (d. 1911)
 8 March – Tom Roberts, artist (born in the United Kingdom) (d. 1931)
 12 March – Rosetta Jane Birks, suffragist (d. 1911)
 11 April – Sydney Smith, New South Wales politician (d. 1934)
 15 June – William Henry O'Malley Wood, banker, public servant and surveyor (d. 1941)
 18 June – Sir Robert Best, Victorian politician and lawyer (d. 1946)
 3 August – Alfred Deakin, 2nd Prime Minister of Australia (d. 1919)
 19 September – Sir Arthur Morgan, 16th Premier of Queensland (d. 1916)
 9 October – Sir Thomas Ewing, New South Wales politician (d. 1920)
 3 December – George Leake, 3rd Premier of Western Australia (d. 1902)

Deaths

 30 January – William Buckley, convict (born in the United Kingdom) (b. 1780)
 3 May – John Wollaston, settler and clergyman (born in the United Kingdom) (b. 1791)
 17 October – William Allen, philanthropist and businessman (born in the United Kingdom) (b. 1790)

References

 
Australia
Years of the 19th century in Australia